The Sanctuary of Demeter and Kore on Acrocorinth was a temple in Ancient Corinth, dedicated to the goddesses Demeter and Kore (Persephone).

The sanctuary was situated on the Acrocorinth, where several other sanctuaries were placed, notably the Temple of Aphrodite on Acrocorinth. The sanctuary first consisted of a sacred area, which in the archaic period included a small temple.  The first more elabourate temple was erected in the 4th century BC. 

In 146 BC, the city of Ancient Corinth was destroyed, and the temple fell into ruins.  When Roman Corinth was founded in 44 BC, the sanctuary was reestablished. In the 1st century, three small Ionic temples were built. 

Pausanias described the temples of the sanctuary: 
"[On the akropolis of Korinthos there is a] temple of the Moirai (Fates) and that of Demeter and Kore (the Maid) have images that are not exposed to view." [...] On the way down to the plain [in the city of Korinthos] is a sanctuary of Demeter, said to have been founded by Plemnaeis as a thank-offering to the goddess for the rearing of his son. [...] What is reported of Plemnaios [mythical king of Korinthos and a grandson of Poseidon], the son of Peratos, seemed to me very wonderful. All the children borne to him by his wife died the very first time they wailed. At last Demeter took pity on Plemnaios, came to Aigialea Sikyonia in the guise of a strange woman, and reared for Plemnaios his son Orthopolis."

The sanctuary was closed in the 4th century during the persecution of pagans in the late Roman Empire. Archeological remains indicate that the temple was attacked by Christian iconoclasts. In a Roman well situated in the sacred area, three heads of statues have been found, identified as a large head belonging to the cult statue of the goddess Demeter, and two smaller heads belonging to portrait sculptures of that of her two priestesses. The heads appear to have been decapitated from the statues, vandalised and thrown down the well. The dates of coins found at the site indicate that this incident occurred during the mid to late 4th century, a period of persecution of pagans, when temples and shrines were attacked by Christians around the Roman Empire. Excavations have been made of the remains of the sanctuary. Significant archeological finds have been made.

References

 Nancy Bookidis, Ronald S. Stroud,  The Sanctuary of Demeter and Kore: Topography and Architecture
 Ronald S. Stroud, The Sanctuary of Demeter and Kore on Acrocorinth. Preliminart Report I: 1961-1962
 Ronald S. Stroud,  The Sanctuary of Demeter and Kore on Acrocorinth. Preliminart Report II: 1964-1965
 Kathleen Warner Slane, The end of the Sanctuary of Demeter and Kore on Acrocorinth, 2008
 JOURNAL ARTICLE. Demeter in Roman Corinth: Local Development in a Mediterranean Religion. Richard E. De Maris. Numen. Vol. 42, No. 2 (May, 1995), pp. 105-117
 Nancy Bookidis, Ronald S. Stroud, The Sanctuary of Demeter and Kore: Topography and Architecture

Temples of Demeter
Temples of Persephone
Ancient Corinth
4th-century BC religious buildings and structures
1st-century religious buildings and structures
Destroyed temples
Persecution of pagans in the late Roman Empire